The judo competition at the 2001 Mediterranean Games was held in Tunis, Tunisia, from 28 June to 1 July 2001.

Medal overview

Men

Women

Medal table

References
Results of the 2001 Mediterranean Games (JudoInside.com)

Med
Judo
2001
Judo competitions in Tunisia